This is a list of notable Old Cliftonians, former pupils of Clifton College in Bristol in the West of England.

See also :Category:People educated at Clifton College.

Academics
 John Barron, classicist and Master of St Peter's College, Oxford
 Eric Birley, Vindolanda archaeologist, Classical scholar
 Simon Blackburn, philosopher, founder of quasi-realism
 Frederick S. Boas, English scholar
 Horatio Brown, historian
 Norman O. Brown, author, philosopher
 Charles Alfred Coulson, mathematician and theoretical chemist
 G. E. M. de Ste. Croix Classical scholar
 Sir Charles Harding Firth, historian
 Herbert Paul Grice, philosopher of language 
Sir Thomas Little Heath, polymath, civil servant, mathematician, classical scholar, historian of ancient Greek mathematics, translator and mountaineer
 Professor Arthur Hutchinson OBE FRS, Master of Pembroke College, Cambridge
 Arthur Wilberforce Jose, historian and journalist
 Martin Lings, scholar
 Patrick McGuinness, academic, critic, novelist and poet 
 John McTaggart Ellis McTaggart, philosopher
 John Pinkerton, designer of world's first business computer, the LEO computer
 Harold Arthur Prichard, philosopher
 Reginald Punnett, geneticist
 Ivor Armstrong Richards scholar, critic, rhetorician author The Meaning of Meaning
 Sir Richard Threlfall, physicist and chemical engineer
 Herbert Hall Turner, Professor of Astronomy and seismologist
 Conrad Hal Waddington, developmental biologist, palaeontologist, geneticist, embryologist and philosopher
 Sir Thomas Herbert Warren, Professor of Poetry and Vice-Chancellor of Oxford University
 R. P. Winnington-Ingram, scholar of Greek tragedy, Professor of Greek at King's College, London

Public life and the law
 Sir John Dyke Acland, 16th Baronet
 Sir James Allen, New Zealand politician
 Mirza Osman Ali Baig, MBE, Indian Army officer, Pakistani diplomat and statesman, and Secretary-General of CENTO
 His Serene Highness Prince Aloys Maria Friedrich Karl of Hohenzollern-Sigmaringen
 Michael Bear, Lord Mayor of London 2010/11
 Christopher Birdwood, 2nd Baron Birdwood, Conservative member of the House of Lords
 Arthur Shirley Benn, 1st Baron Glenravel, KBE Conservative MP.
 Leslie Hore-Belisha, Minister of War, 1937–1940
 Sir Edward John Cameron, colonial administrator
 Lothian Bonham-Carter, English cricketer, Justice of the Peace and soldier
 Sir Edgar Bonham-Carter,  CIE Barrister
 John Bonham-Carter (1817-1884) Liberal Party Politician
 Sydney Buxton, 1st Earl Buxton, GCMG, PC
 Sir John Biggs-Davison, Conservative politician
 Sir Richard Ashmole Cooper, 2nd Baronet, Conservative MP
 Viscount Caldecote, Sir Thomas Inskip, lawyer, politician and Lord Chancellor
 Alban Dobson, civil servant, secretary of the International Whaling Commission, president of the International Council for the Exploration of the Sea
 Raymond Evershed, 1st Baron Evershed, Master of the Rolls and Law Lord
 Geoff Gollop, OBE, Deputy Mayor of Bristol, former Lord Mayor and former Deputy Lord Mayor of Bristol
 Jeremy Hackett British fashion designer, founder of Hackett clothing
 Sir James Heath Bt, MP North West Staffordshire.
 Herbert Hervey, 5th Marquess of Bristol, Diplomat
 Sir Thomas Little Heath, Treasury Secretary and scholar and author.
 Lord Henley 8th Baron Henley. Tory Politician
 Sir Roger Hollis, journalist, secret-service agent and director general of MI5
 Syed Fakhar Imam, the 11th Speaker of National Assembly of Pakistan.
 Patrick Jenkin, Baron Jenkin of Roding, Conservative politician
 Sir John Keane, 5th Baronet, Irish Politician, Senator 1st, 2nd, 3rd Seanad
 Neville Laski QC Judge and leader of Anglo Jewry
 Sir John May, Judge
 Navendu Mishra, Labour MP
 Sir Alan Abraham Mocatta, English judge, leader of Spanish and Portuguese Jews in the UK
 Edwin Samuel Montagu, Liberal politician
 Louis Samuel Montagu, 2nd Baron Swaythling
 Sir Max Muspratt, 1st Baronet, Industrialist and Liberal MP
 Sir Peter Newsam chairman of Commission for Racial Equality and Inner London Education Authority chief education officer.
 Arthur Richards, 1st Baron Milverton GCMG
 Hector Sants, head of the Financial Services Authority
 Colin Sleeman, Assistant Judge Advocate General, senior defence counsel for Japanese accused of war crimes
 Abel Thomas, Welsh Liberal MP
 Col. Josiah Wedgwood, 1st Baron Wedgwood, brother of Sir Ralph Wedgwood, 1st Baronet, Liberal and Labour, Minister in Ramsay MacDonald government.
 Sir Ralph Lewis Wedgwood, 1st Bt
 Philip William Wheeldon Bishop of Whitby
 Sir Rowland Whitehead, 3rd Baronet KC MP, barrister and politician
 John Henry Whitley, Speaker of the House of Commons 1921–1928
 Leonard Wolfson, Baron Wolfson, Conservative politician
 Baron Wyfold, Colonel Sir Robert Trotter Hermon-Hodge, Bt MP.

Military
 Field Marshal Douglas Haig
 Field Marshal William Riddell Birdwood, 1st Baron Birdwood
 Lieutenant General Frederick E. Morgan
 Sir Francis Younghusband, British Army officer, explorer, and spiritualist
 Sir Hugh Elles KCB KCMG KCVO DSO, general
 Sir Charles Bonham-Carter, General of the Territorial Army and Governor and Commander-in-Chief of Malta.
 Lieutenant Colonel Oswald Watt, Australian flying ace in First World War
 Percy Hobart KBE CB DSO MC, military engineer
 Cecil Rawling, CMG CIE DSO FRGS, soldier, explorer and author
 Alexander Kearsey, OBE, DSO, soldier, cricketer and military historian
 Lothian Bonham-Carter, English cricketer, Justice of the Peace and soldier
 Jock Hamilton-Baillie MC
 John Whitty, MC DSO
 Sir Charles Cuyler, 4th Baronet OBE, soldier and cricketer
 Leslie Innes Jacques, CB, CBE, MC, British Army engineer officer

Holders of the Victoria Cross
Eight Old Cliftonians have won the Victoria Cross, one in the Second Boer War, five in the First World War (1914–1918), one in the Russian Civil War (North Russia Relief Force, 1919), and one in the Second World War.
Second Boer War:
Sergeant Horace Robert Martineau VC (at Clifton 1888–1889) (1874–1916). He later achieved the rank of Lieutenant.
First World War:
Richard Douglas Sandford VC (11 May 1891 – 23 November 1918) was a Royal Navy officer who took part in the Zeebrugge Raid and won the Victoria Cross.
Captain Theodore Wright, VC (at Clifton 1897–1900) (1883–1914)
Lieutenant Cyril Gordon Martin, VC, CBE, DSO (at Clifton 1910-1910) (1891–1980). He later achieved the rank of Brigadier.
Lieutenant Edward Donald Bellew, VC (at Clifton 1897–1900) (1882–1961). He later achieved the rank of Captain.
Captain George Henry Tatham Paton, VC, MC (at Clifton 1909–1914) (1895–1917)
Russian Civil War:
Commander Claude Congreve Dobson, VC, DSO (at Clifton 1893–1900) (1885–1940)
Second World War:
Lance-Corporal John Pennington Harman, VC, (at Clifton 1923–1925) (1914–1944)

Arts and Sciences

Literature
 C. E. W. Bean, War Correspondent and Official Historian of Australia during the First World War
 Joyce Cary, writer
 L. P. Hartley, author
 Robert Smythe Hichens, Author and playwright
 Geoffrey Household, author
 Clifford Henry Benn Kitchin, author
 Tim Mackintosh-Smith, author and television presenter
 Alan Noel Latimer Munby, author
 Henry Newbolt, poet
 Sir Arthur Thomas Quiller-Couch, poet (pseudonym  "Q”).
 George Shipway, novelist
 Montague Summers, author, translator, Occultist, scandalous Clergyman and member of Uranian poets- bards of Greco-Roman pederasty.

Drama, Theatre and Performing Arts
 John Cleese, Monty Python actor
 Manuel del Campo, film editor, actor, and third husband to Mary Astor 
 Thorold Dickinson, film director, screenwriter and producer.
 Donald Hewlett, actor
 John Houseman, actor, director and producer
 Trevor Howard, actor
 John Inverdale, television presenter
 John Madden, film director
 Roger Michell, film & theatre director
 Alan Napier, actor
 Sir Michael Redgrave, actor
 Sir Simon Russell Beale, actor
 Chris Serle, television presenter
 Simon Shepherd, actor
 Tim Sullivan, film and television director and screenwriter
 Clive Swift, actor
 David Swift, actor
 Naunton Wayne, actor
 Neil Constable, Chief Executive of Shakespeare's Globe (2010–present), Executive Director and Chief Executive of Almeida Theatre (2003 to 2010) 
 Jonah Trenouth, actor and model. Starred in the 2002 film Thunderpants

Music
 Joseph Cooper
 Scott Ford, musician
 John Rippiner Heath, physician and composer
 C. S. Lang, organist and composer
 Boris Ord, conductor
 Ian Partridge, tenor
 Harry Plunket Greene
 A. J. Potter, composer
 Martina Topley-Bird, musician
 Peter Tranchell, composer
 Sir David Willcocks, conductor
 Jonathan Willcocks, composer
 Nicky Chinn, songwriter
 Kitty Brucknell, singer/songwriter

Education
 C.T. Atkinson, tutor in history at Exeter College, Oxford, 1898-1955).
J. R. Eccles, schoolmaster and author

Fine arts
Roger Fry, artist
Derek Gillman, President of the Barnes Foundation
Peter Lanyon (1918–1964) Cornish painter of Euston Road School.
Henry Tonks, English surgeon, artist, like Fry, Slade Professor of Fine Art
 Dr Charles J F Coombs.  Founder member of the society of wildlife artists.

Science
 Philip D'Arcy Hart (1900–2006), pioneer in tuberculosis treatment
Victor Riddell FRCS, cricketer and surgeon
Frank Yates FRS, statistician

Nobel Prize winners
 John Kendrew (Chemistry)
 John Hicks (Economics)
 Nevill Mott (Physics)

Journalism
 Sir William Emsley Carr, Chairman of The News of the World 
 Roger Alton, editor of The Observer
 Leigh Brownlee, cricketer and former editor of the Daily Mirror
 William Hanson, columnist for Mail Online, author, etiquette coach and broadcaster
 Francis Wrigley Hirst, editor of The Economist
 Hugh Schofield, BBC Paris Correspondent
 Steve Scott, ITV newscaster and former ITN foreign correspondent
 Richard Stott, journalist
 Andrew Wilson, Sky News news presenter and former foreign correspondent

Sports (in alphabetical order)

Cricket, rugby and football
 Basil Allen, cricketer, Gloucestershire captain
 Joseph Beardsell, cricketer
 Lothian Bonham-Carter, English cricketer, Justice of the Peace and soldier
 William Brain, English cricketer and footballer
 James Bush Gloucestershire cricketer, England rugby international
 Robert Edwin Bush Gloucestershire cricketer
 Charles Carnegy , cricketer
 A. E. J. Collins, cricketer, world record holder (highest individual score as batsman)
 John Daniell, captain of Somerset, England rugby international
 David Dickinson, cricketer
 Alban Dobson, cricketer
 Archibald Fargus, English cricketer, scholar, clergyman
 Edwin Field, Middlesex cricketer, England rugby international
 Sir Stephen Finney, England rugby international
 W. G. Grace junior, Gloucestershire and MCC cricketer
 George Harrison, cricketer
 Hubert Johnston, Scottish cricketer
 R. P. Keigwin, England cricketer and hockey player
 Sir Kingsmill Key, Bt., captain of Surrey, MCC and England cricketer.
 James Kirtley, England cricketer
 Ioan Lloyd, Wales and Bristol Bears rugby player
 Meredith Magniac, cricketer
 Frank May, cricketer
 Thomas Penny, cricketer
 Rowland Raw, Royal Navy cricketer
 Henry Schwann, cricketer
 Dr. Edward Scott, Gloucestershire & MCC cricketer, England rugby international (captain).
 Louie Shaw, cricketer
 Thomas Stubbs, cricketer
 Charlie Townsend, England cricketer
 Edward Tylecote, England cricketer
 Henry Tylecote, cricketer
 George Whitehead, England cricketer
 John Whitty, cricketer and British Army officer
 Matt Windows, Gloucestershire cricketer and England 'A' cap.

Other
 Jerry Cornes, English Olympic runner
 Justin Chaston, Welsh athlete who competed at three Olympic Games for Great Britain
 Walter Gibb, world record holder (altitude)
 Rowley Leigh, English chef
 Michael Francis Middleton, Businessman and father of Catherine, Duchess of Cambridge. Both Middleton's father, Capt. Peter Francis Middleton (d.2010) and his grandfather, solicitor and company director Richard Noel Middleton (d.1951) also boarded at Clifton
Ernest Geoffrey Parsons CVO, CBE,  farmer and a commissioner of the crown estates.
 William Pollock, English chess master
Lily Owsley, Hockey GB and England
Boris Schapiro, bridge player
Simon Hazlitt, Hockey GB and England

Business
 Walter Owen Bentley, founder of Bentley Motors
 John Wyndham Beynon, entrepreneur of the fossil fuel and metals industry
 Sir Trevor Chinn, Tycoon and Philanthropist
 Sir Hugo Cunliffe-Owen, 1st Baronet, business man, chairman of British-American Tobacco Company
 Sir Roy Fedden, engineer
 Jeremy Hackett, fashion designer and entrepreneur
Patrick Seager Hill T.D. clothing manufacturer, who was a pioneer & developer  of safety & fire protective clothing.
 Andy Hornby, former Chief Executive of HBOS
 Anthony Jacobs, Baron Jacobs, entrepreneur
 Sir Horace Kadoorie, industrialist, hotelier, and philanthropist
 Lord Kadoorie, industrialist, hotelier, and philanthropist
 Julian Richer, entrepreneur, owner of Richer Sounds
 Sir James Swinburne, 9th Baronet, industrialist
 Hector Sants, head of the Financial Services Authority
 Sir Clive Thompson former Chairman of Farepak and Chief executive of Rentokil Initial
 Sir Robert Waley Cohen, industrialist and leader of Anglo-Jewry
 Sir Bernard Waley Cohen, business man and Lord Mayor of London
 Henry Herbert Wills, tobacco baron and philanthropist
 Leonard Wolfson, Baron Wolfson, business man, chairman of GUS
 David Wolfson, Baron Wolfson of Sunningdale, politician, businessman, chairman of Next

Fictional
Christopher Tietjens, the protagonist of Ford Madox Ford's Parade's End.

See also
Old Cliftonian Society

References

 
Clifton
Old Cliftonians